The VII Army Corps of the United States Army was one of the two principal corps of the United States Army Europe during the Cold War. Activated in 1918 for World War I, it was reactivated for World War II and again during the Cold War. During both World War II and the Cold War it was subordinate to the Seventh Army, or USAREUR and was headquartered at Kelley Barracks in Stuttgart, West Germany, from 1951 until it was redeployed to the US after significant success in the Gulf War in 1991, then inactivated in 1992.

World War I 
VII Corps was organized at the end of World War I on 19 August 1918, at Remiremont, France and was inactivated on 11 July 1919. It was commanded by Major Generals William M. Wright, Omar Bundy, William G. Haan, and Henry Tureman Allen. It was composed of the 6th, 81st and 88th Divisions, and served in the Vosges Sector.

Post-World War I
The U.S. VII Corps was reactivated as part of the Organized Reserve (OR) on 29 July 1921 and inactivated on 18 October 1927. It was allotted to the Seventh Corps Area and assigned to the Third Army. In accordance with General Order #2, HQ, Seventh Corps Area, the Corps Headquarters was activated on 9 January 1922 at the Old Customhouse, 3d and Olive Streets, St. Louis, MO, with Regular Army and OR personnel.

World War II 
VII Corps was reactivated at Fort McClellan, Alabama 25 November 1940 and participated in the Louisiana Maneuvers staged as the US Army prepared for World War II. In late December 1941, VII Corps HQ was moved to San Jose, California as part of the Western Defense Command and as it continued to train and prepare for deployment.

Its first return to continental Europe took place on D-Day in June 1944, as one of the two assault corps for the U.S. First Army during Operation Overlord, targeting Utah Beach via amphibious assault. For Overlord, the 82nd and 101st Airborne Divisions were attached to VII Corps. After the Battle of Normandy the airborne units were assigned to the newly created XVIII Airborne Corps. Subsequently, VII Corps participated in many battles during the advance across France; this included taking 25,000 German prisoners during the Battle of the Mons Pocket in early September 1944. The corps subsequently took part in the invasion of Germany until the surrender of the Third Reich in May 1945. The corps was inactivated in 1946.

Battle of Normandy 

For the Normandy Operation, VII Corps was part of 21st Army Group under the command of General Bernard Montgomery and the U.S. First Army commanded by Lieutenant General Courtney Hodges. The Corps was commanded by Major General J. Lawton Collins.

VII Corps led the initial assault of Operation Cobra, the First Army-led offensive as part of the breakout of the Normandy area. Its success is credited with changing the war in France from high-intensity infantry combat to rapid maneuver warfare.

Assigned Units and Commanders 
  4th Infantry Division, Major General Raymond O. Barton
8th Infantry Regiment Colonel James A. Van Fleet
 12th Infantry Regiment Colonel Russell P. Reeder (11 June)
Lieutenant Colonel Hervey Tribolet
22nd Infantry Regiment Colonel Hervey A. Tribolet
Colonel Robert T. Foster (26 June)
  9th Infantry Division, Major General Manton S. Eddy
39th Infantry Regiment Colonel Harry A. "Paddy" Flint
47th Infantry Regiment Colonel George W. Smythe
60th Infantry Regiment Colonel Frederick J. de Rohan
  79th Infantry Division, Major General Ira T. Wyche
313th Infantry Regiment Colonel Sterling A. Wood
314th Infantry Regiment Colonel Warren A. Robinson
315th Infantry Regiment Colonel Porter P. Wiggins
Colonel Bernard B. McMahon (24 June)
  82nd Airborne Division, Major General Matthew Ridgway
505th Parachute Infantry Regiment Colonel William E. Ekman
507th Parachute Infantry Regiment Colonel George V. Millett, Jr.
Colonel Edson D. Raff (15 June)
508th Parachute Infantry Regiment Colonel Roy E. Lindquist
325th Glider Infantry Regiment Colonel Harry L. Lewis
  90th Infantry Division, Brigadier General Jay W. MacKelvie
357th Infantry Regiment Colonel Philip De Witt Ginder
Colonel John W. Sheehy (13 June)
Lieutenant Colonel Charles M. Schwab (15 June)
Colonel George B. Barth (17 June)
358th Infantry Regiment Colonel James V. Thompson
Colonel Richard C. Partridge (16 June)
359th Infantry Regiment Colonel Clark K. Fales
  101st Airborne Division, Major General Maxwell D. Taylor
501st Parachute Infantry Regiment Colonel Howard R. Johnson
502nd Parachute Infantry Regiment Colonel George V. H. Moseley, Jr. (WIA 6 June)
Lieutenant Colonel John H. Michaelis (6 June)
506th Parachute Infantry Regiment Colonel Robert Sink
327th Glider Infantry Regiment Colonel George S. Wear
Colonel Joseph H. Harper (10 June)
  4th Cavalry Group (Mechanized), Colonel Joseph M. Tully
4th Cavalry Squadron Lieutenant Colonel E. C. Dunn
24th Cavalry Squadron Lieutenant Colonel F. H. Gaston, Jr.
  6th Armored Group, Colonel Francis F. Fainter
70th Tank Battalion Lieutenant Colonel John C. Welborn
746th Tank Battalion Lieutenant Colonel C. G. Hupfer

Cold War 

From reactivation in 1950 and throughout the Cold War, the corps guarded part of NATO's front with the Warsaw Pact. Headquartered in Stuttgart at Kelley Barracks it was one of the two main US combat formations in Germany along with V Corps, which was headquartered in Frankfurt am Main at Abrams Building.

As finally envisaged in the General Defense Plan circa 1989, the 1st Canadian Division with its main headquarters at Kingston, Ontario, would have been assigned to the Commander, Central Army Group's tactical reserve, fighting alongside either the German II Corps or VII Corps.

Structure 1989 

At the end of the Cold War in 1989 VII Corps consisted of the following units:

  VII Corps, Stuttgart, West Germany
 1st Armored Division, Ansbach
 1st Infantry Division (Mechanized), Fort Riley, Kansas (Operation Reforger unit)
 1st Infantry Division (Forward), Göppingen, West Germany
 3rd Infantry Division (Mechanized), Würzburg
 VII Corps Artillery, Augsburg
 17th Field Artillery Brigade, Augsburg
 72nd Field Artillery Brigade, Wertheim
 210th Field Artillery Brigade, Herzogenaurach
 2nd Armored Cavalry Regiment, Nuremberg
 11th Aviation Brigade, Illesheim
 7th Engineer Brigade, Kornwestheim
 14th Military Police Brigade, Kornwestheim
 93rd Signal Brigade (Corps), Ludwigsburg
 207th Military Intelligence Brigade, Ludwigsburg
 2nd Corps Support Command, Nellingen auf den Fildern
 602nd Air Support Operations Group, USAF Stuttgart

Gulf War 

After Saddam Hussein's troops invaded Kuwait in 1990, the corps was deployed to Saudi Arabia as part of the second major wave of deployments of American forces. Its presence took US forces in theatre from a force capable of defending Saudi Arabia to a force capable of ejecting Iraqi troops from Kuwait.

In the Gulf War, VII Corps was probably the most powerful formation of its type ever to take to the battlefield. Normally, a corps commands three divisions when at full strength, along with other units such as artillery of various types, corps-level engineers and support units. However, VII Corps had far more firepower under its command.  It consisted of 1,487 tanks, 1,384 infantry fighting vehicles, 568 artillery pieces, 132 MLRS, 8 missile launchers, and 242 attack helicopters. It had a total troop strength of 146,321 troops.

Its principal full strength fighting formations were the 1st Armored Division (United States), the 3rd Armored Division (United States) and the 1st Infantry Division (United States). The 2nd Armored Division (Forward) was assigned to the 1st Infantry Division as its third maneuver brigade. In addition, the corps had the 2nd Cavalry Regiment (United States) to act as a scouting and screening force, and two further heavy divisions, the 1st Cavalry Division (United States) and the 1st Armoured Division (United Kingdom), as well as the 11th Aviation Group. Although both 1st Cavalry Division and 1st Armoured Division had only two maneuver brigades, they were still immensely powerful formations in their own right.

VII Corps was originally deployed to provide an offensive option if needed. In the 100-hour war they were given a mission: To destroy the Iraqi Republican Guard's heavy divisions. That meant that the 1st Infantry Division had to make a forced entry to make room for the British attack on the right wing and to secure the main forces advance on the left. That attack force was led by the 2nd Armored Cavalry Regiment and Task Force 1-41 Infantry followed by the other two brigades of the 1st Infantry Division. The 1st Armored Division would head north to engage the Iraqi Republican Guard in the Battle of Medina Ridge. The 3rd Armored Division would protect the flank of the 1st Infantry Division. That gave VII Corps commander General Frederick M. Franks, Jr. a three division strike force to confront several Iraqi Armored Divisions. After the corps had turned 90 degrees east according to FRAGPLAN 7 and after the Cavalry Regiment had fought the single sided Battle of 73 Easting the three Divisions (plus the British on the right wing) fought one of the most one-sided battles in the history of the U.S. Army.

VII Corps cut a swath through Iraqi forces. It advanced with U.S. XVIII Airborne Corps on its left wing and Arab forces on its right wing. Led by Task Force 1-41 Infantry it pulverized all Iraqi forces that tried to stand and fight and destroyed a good proportion of the Iraqi Republican Guard divisions. This confrontation was known as the Battle of Norfolk.

VII Corps' attack destroyed several divisions including the Medina and the Tawakalna Republican Guards division along with support units. It also destroyed most of the Iraqi VII Corps that had guarded the frontline as well as other units. The Battle of 73 Easting was studied as a textbook armored battle within the US armored units. The cost in lives was 36 US and UK dead; trifling in terms of expected casualties for the war the two armies had trained for against the Soviets.

'Virtually every manoeuvre battalion in the 1st and 3rd Armored Divisions, 1st Inf Div (M), and 2 ACR received the Valorous Unit Award. In addition, 'six of the ten VII Corps manoeuvre brigade headquarters that saw substantial combat against the Republican Guard received the VUA in contravention of the spirit, if not the letter, of AR672-5-1's guidance that '[o]nly on rare occasions will a unit larger than a battalion qualify for award of the VUA.'

During the Gulf War VII Corps destroyed nearly 1,350 Iraqi tanks, 1,224 armored troop carriers, 285 artillery pieces, 105 air defense systems, 1,229 trucks, and lost nearly 36 armored vehicles. They suffered a total of 47 dead and 192 wounded.

VII Corps
LTG Frederick M. Franks, Jr.

 1st Armored Division
MG Ronald H. Griffith
 3rd Brigade, 3rd Infantry Division (Mech) – Acting 1st Brigade
4th BN, 66th Armor Regiment
1st BN, 7th Infantry Regiment (Mech)
4th BN, 7th Infantry Regiment (Mech)
2nd BN, 41st Field Artillery Regiment (155SP)
2nd Brigade
1st BN, 35th Armor Regiment
2nd BN, 70th Armor Regiment
4th BN, 70th Armor Regiment
6th BN, 6th Infantry Regiment (Mech)
2nd BN, 1st Field Artillery Regiment (155SP)
3rd Brigade
3rd BN, 35th Armor Regiment
1st BN, 37th Armor Regiment
7th BN, 6th Infantry Regiment (Mech)
3rd BN, 1st Field Artillery Regiment (155SP)

 3rd Armored Division
MG Paul E. Funk
1st Brigade
4th BN, 32nd Armor Regiment
4th BN, 34th Armor Regiment
3rd BN, 5th Cavalry Regiment (Mech)
5th BN, 5th Cavalry Regiment (Mech)
3rd BN, 1st Field Artillery Regiment (155SP)
2nd Brigade
4th BN, 18th Infantry Regiment (Mech)
3rd BN, 8th Cavalry Regiment (Armor)
4th BN, 8th Cavalry Regiment (Armor)
4th BN, 82nd Field Artillery Regiment (155SP)
3rd Brigade
5th BN, 18th Infantry Regiment (Mech)
2nd BN, 67th Armor Regiment
4th BN, 67th Armor Regiment
2nd BN, 82nd Field Artillery Regiment (155SP)

 1st Infantry Division (Mech)
MG Thomas Rhame
1st Brigade
5th BN, 16th Infantry Regiment (Mech)
1st BN, 34th Armor Regiment
2nd BN, 34th Armor Regiment
1st Bn, 5th Field Artillery Regiment (155SP)
2nd Brigade
2nd BN, 16th Infantry Regiment (Mech)
3rd BN, 37th Armor Regiment
4th BN, 37th Armor Regiment
4th Bn, 5th Field Artillery Regiment (155SP)
 3rd Brigade, 2nd Armored Division – Acting 3rd Brigade
1st BN, 41st Infantry Regiment (Mech)
2nd BN, 66th Armor Regiment
3rd BN, 66th Armor Regiment
4th Bn, 3rd Field Artillery Regiment (155SP)

1st (UK) Armoured Division
Maj Gen Rupert Smith
 4th Armoured Brigade
Brig. Christopher Hammerbeck
14th/20th King's Hussars & squadron of Life Guards (Challenger 1)
1st Bn, Royal Scots (Warrior)
3rd Bn, Royal Regiment of Fusiliers (Warrior)
2nd Field Regiment RA (155SP)
23 Engineer Regiment (AVRE)
 7th Armoured Brigade
Brig. Patrick Cordingley
Royal Scots Dragoon Guards & troops of 17th/21st Lancers (Challenger)
Queen's Royal Irish Hussars (Challenger)
1st Bn, Staffordshire Regiment (Warrior)
40th Field Regiment RA (155SP)
21 Engineer Regiment (AVRE)
Divisional Armoured Reconnaissance unit
16th/5th The Queen's Royal Lancers & squadron Queen's Dragoon Guards (Scimitar/Spartan/Striker)
Divisional Artillery Group
32nd Heavy Regiment RA (203SP)
39th Heavy Regiment RA (MLRS)
26th Field Regiment RA (155SP)
12th Air Defence Regiment RA (Rapier)
 
 1st Cavalry Division(-) Missing 3rd Brigade
MG John H. Tilelli, Jr.
1st Brigade
3rd BN, 32nd Armor Regiment
2nd BN, 8th Cavalry Regiment (Armor)
2nd BN, 5th Cavalry Regiment (Mech)
1st BN, 82nd Field Artillery Regiment (155SP)
2nd Brigade
1st BN, 32nd Armor Regiment
1st BN, 5th Cavalry Regiment (Mech)
1st BN, 8th Cavalry Regiment (Armor)
3rd BN, 82nd Field Artillery Regiment (155SP)

Corps assets

 2nd Armored Cavalry Regiment

 11th Aviation Brigade 
 2nd Squadron 6th Cavalry
 6th Squadron 6th Cavalry

7th Engineer Brigade
 109th Engineer Group SD ARNG – Supported VII Corp
9th Engineer Battalion (CBT)(MECH)
527th Engineer Battalion (CBT HVY) LA ARNG
 176th Engineer Group VA ARNG – Supported 1st Inf Div
19th Engineer Battalion (Corps CBT)
54th Engineer Battalion (CBT)(MECH)
82nd Engineer Battalion (CBT)(MECH)
92nd Engineer Battalion (CBT HVY)
565th Engineer Battalion
649th Engineer Battalion (TOPO)
 926th Engineer Group USAR – Supported 1st Arm Div
249th Engineer Battalion (CBT HVY)
317th Engineer Battalion (CBT)(MECH)
588th Engineer Battalion (CORPS CBT)

 42nd Field Artillery Brigade – Supported 1st Inf Div, 3rd Armd Div
3rd BN, 20th Field Artillery Regiment (155SP)
1st BN, 27th Field Artillery Regiment (MLRS)
2nd BN, 29th Field Artillery Regiment (155SP)

 75th Field Artillery Brigade – Supported 1st Inf Div, 1st Armd Div
1st BN, 17th Field Artillery Regiment (155SP)
5th BN, 18th Field Artillery Regiment (203SP)
1st BN, 158th Field Artillery Regiment (MLRS) OK ARNG

 142nd Field Artillery Brigade AR ARNG –  Supported 1st Inf Div, 1st UK Armd Div
1st BN, 142nd Field Artillery Regiment (203SP) AR ARNG
2nd BN, 142nd Field Artillery Regiment (203SP) AR ARNG

 210th Field Artillery Brigade – Supported 2nd ACR, 1st Inf Div
3rd BN, 17th Field Artillery Regiment (155SP)
6th BN, 41st Field Artillery Regiment (155SP)
C Btry, 4th Battalion, 27th Field Artillery (MLRS)

2nd Corps Support Command
7th Corps Support Group
6th Transportation Battalion
71st Maintenance Battalion
87th Maintenance Battalion
213th Support Battalion
16th Corps Support Group
4th Transportation Battalion
101st Ordinance Battalion 
13th Support Battalion
300th Service & Support Battalion
30th Corps Support Group NC ARNG
136th Quartermaster Battalion
690th Maintenance Battalion
43rd Corps Support Group
68th Transportation Battalion
169th Maintenance Battalion
544th Maintenance Battalion
553rd Service & Support Battalion
159th Corps Support Group USAR
286th Supply & Service Battalion ME ARNG

 332nd Medical Brigade USAR
127th Medical Group AL ARNG
31st Combat Support Hospital
128th Combat Support Hospital
377th Combat Support Hospital USAR
403rd Combat Support Hospital USAR
341st Medical Group USAR
159th Mobile Army Surgical Hospital LA ARNG
475th Mobile Army Surgical Hospital KY ARNG
807th Mobile Army Surgical Hospital USAR
912th Mobile Army Surgical Hospital USAR
345th Combat Support Hospital USAR – Converted to a MASH in January
Task Forces Evac (Provisional)
12th Evacuation Hospital
13th Evacuation Hospital WI ARNG
148th Evacuation Hospital AR ARNG
312th Evacuation Hospital USAR
410th Evacuation Hospital USAR

 14th Military Police Brigade
93rd Military Police Battalion
95th Military Police Battalion
118th Military Police Battalion RI ARNG
372nd Military Police Battalion DC ARNG
793rd Military Police Battalion

 93rd Signal Brigade

 207th Military Intelligence Brigade
2nd Military Intelligence Battalion
307th Military Intelligence Battalion
511th Military Intelligence Battalion

Redeployment and inactivation 
After the fighting was over, most VII Corps units were redeployed directly to the United States for reassignment or inactivation. VII Corps HQ returned to Germany and was disbanded as part of the post-Cold War American defense spending cuts. Some VII Corps units remained in Germany and were reassigned to V Corps or USAREUR. A farewell ceremony was held in downtown Stuttgart at Schlossplatz, where the VII Corps colors were retired on 18 March 1992. The official inactivation was held at Fort McPherson, Ga., in April 1992.

Commanders during the Cold War and Gulf War 
 Maj. Gen. Withers A. Burress - June 1951 - December 1952
 Maj. Gen. James M. Gavin - December 1952 - March 1954
 Lt. Gen. Henry I. Hodes - March 1954 - February 1955
 Lt. Gen. George H. Decker - February 1955 - May 1956
 Maj. Gen. Halley G. Maddox - June - July 1956	
 Lt. Gen. John F. Uncles - August 1956 - August 1958	
 Lt. Gen. Gordon B. Rogers - September 1958 - October 1959	
 Lt. Gen. Guy S. Meloy Jr. - October 1959 - January 1961	
 Lt. Gen. John C. Oakes - January 1961 - April 1962	
 Lt. Gen. C. H. Bonesteel III - April 1962 - August 1963	
 Lt. Gen. Louis W. Truman - September 1963 - July 1965 	
 Lt. Gen. Frank T. Mildren - July 1965 - May 1968	
 Lt. Gen. Donald V. Bennett - June 1968 - September 1969	
 Lt. Gen. George G. O'Connor - October 1969 - February 1971	
 Lt. Gen. Fillmore K. Mearns - February 1971- March 1973	
 Lt. Gen. George S. Blanchard - March 1973 - June 1975	
 Lt. Gen. Frederick J. Kroesen - July 1975 - October 1976	
 Lt. Gen. David E. Ott - October 1976 - October 1978	
 Lt. Gen. Julius W. Becton Jr. - October 1978 - June 1981	
 Lt. Gen. William J. Livsey - June 1981 - July 1983	
 Lt. Gen. John R. Galvin - July 1983 - February 1985	
 Lt. Gen. Andrew P. Chambers - February 1985 - July 1987	
 Lt. Gen. Ronald L. Watts - July 1987 - August 1989	
 Lt. Gen. Frederick M. Franks Jr. - August 1989 - June 1991	
 Lt. Gen. Michael Spiglemire - August 1991 - 1992 (Inactivation)

References 

Casey, Melanie (13 July 2004), "From Helenen Kaserne to Kelley Barracks", Stuttgart Citizen (Stuttgart, Germany): P 10

 Draft Report The Battle of 73 Easting, 26 February 1991, a historical introduction to a simulation. Krause, Col Michael, US Army Center of Military History, 2 May 1991.

External links 
 GlobalSecurity.org: VII Corps
 Cold War History of VII Corps
 World War II operations history of VII Corps
 History site for VII Corps
 Order of Battle information on VII Corps

Military units and formations established in 1918
07
07
Military units and formations of the United States in the Cold War
1918 establishments in the United States
Military units and formations disestablished in 1992